The 307th Operations Group is an Air Reserve Component of the United States Air Force.  It is assigned to the 307th Bomb Wing, Air Force Reserve Command, stationed at Barksdale Air Force Base, Louisiana.

In the postwar era, the 307th Bombardment Group was one of the USAAF bombardment groups assigned to Strategic Air Command on 4 August 1946, the group being activated as a redesignation of the 498th Bombardment Group due to the Air Force's policy of retaining only low-numbered groups on active duty after the war.  The group deployed to Okinawa during the Korean War and was awarded the Republic of Korea Presidential Unit Citation for its air strikes against enemy forces in Korea. It was also awarded the Distinguished Unit Citation and several campaign streamers.

Mission
The 307th Operations Group was activated on 8 January 2011.  Its mission is strategic nuclear deterrence and global strike.

The  Air Force Reserve wing is a Boeing B-52 Stratofortress unit whose mission is to train B-52 pilots in initial qualification. The B-52 combat mission is to employ the bomber in support of Air Force worldwide conventional commitments.

History

World War II

Activated on 15 April 1942. Trained and flew patrols off the West Coast, first in Boeing B-17 Flying Fortresses and later in Consolidated B-24 Liberators. Moved to Hawaii, October–November 1942, and assigned to Seventh Air Force. Trained and flew patrol and search missions. Attacked Wake Island, December 1942 – January 1943, by staging through Midway Island.

Moved to Guadalcanal in February 1943 and assigned to Thirteenth Air Force. Served in combat, primarily in the South and Southwest Pacific, until the war ended. Attacked Japanese airfields, installations, and shipping in the Solomon Islands and Bismarck Islands. Helped to neutralize enemy bases on Yap and in the Truk and Palau Islands. Received a Distinguished Unit Citation for an unescorted, daylight attack on heavily defended airfields in the Truk Islands on 29 March 1944. Supported operations in the Philippines by striking Japanese shipping in the southern Philippines and by bombing airfields on Leyte, Luzon, Negros, Ceram, and Halmahera. Also took part in Allied air operations against the Netherlands East Indies by hitting airfields, shipping, and installations.

Received a Distinguished Unit Citation for an unescorted mission against vital oil refineries at Balikpapan, Borneo, on 3 October 1944. Supported Australian forces on Borneo and bombed targets in French Indochina during the last three months of the war.

Two Presidential Unit Citations were awarded to the Group during World War II, one for action in the bombing of the Island of Truk, the most heavily defended and strongly fortified Japanese base in the Pacific. During withdrawal. gunners of the Group destroyed 31 of the 75 attacking aircraft, probably destroyed 12 more and damaged 10 in an air battle that lasted 43 minutes. This daring raid, made on 29 March 1944, neutralized the Japanese airfields, making possible long range flights without fighter protection, The other Presidential Unit Citation was awarded for the successful strike at the Baltkapapan Oil Refineries in Borneo on 30 September 1944. The 307th had to fly their B-24 Liberator bombers 17 1/2 hours for a round trip of 2,610 miles, the longest mass daylight mission ever flown by this type aircraft.

Flew patrol missions along the Asiatic mainland and ferried liberated prisoners from Okinawa to Manila after V-J Day. Returned to the US, December 1945 – January 1946. Inactivated on 18 January 1946.

Strategic Air Command

Redesignated 307th Bombardment Group (Very Heavy). Activated on 4 August 1946 from the personnel and equipment of the 498th Bombardment Group. Assigned to Strategic Air Command at MacDill Air Force Base, Florida. Equipped with Boeing B-29 Superfortresses. Trained and developed antisubmarine tactics. Redesignated 307th Bombardment Group, Medium in May 1948.

It deployed from MacDill on 1 August 1950 to Kadena Air Base on Okinawa for combat during the Korean War. The 307th was the third Strategic Air Command B-29 Superfortress group deployed, and was attached to Far East Air Forces.  Attacked strategic objectives in North Korea, August–September 1950. After that, struck interdictory targets, including communications and supply centers, and supported UN ground forces by hitting gun emplacements and troop concentrations.  During its combat deployment, the group had flown over 5800 sorties. Twenty-two planes were reported lost.

Became non-operational when parent wing adopted Dual Deputate organization, 10 February 1951 and all assigned squadrons were attached directly to the wing. Inactivated 16 June 1952

Reactivated in 1977 as a Boeing KC-135 Stratotanker air refueling group at Travis Air Force Base, California. Inactivated in 1983 due to a SAC reorganization.

Lineage
 Constituted as the 307th Bombardment Group (Heavy) on 28 January 1942
 Activated on 15 April 1942
 Redesignated 307th Bombardment Group, Heavy on 20 August 1943
 Inactivated on 18 January 1946
 Redesignated 307th Bombardment Group, Very Heavy on 15 July 1946
 Activated on 4 August 1946  
 Redesignated 307th Bombardment Group, Medium on 28 May 1948
 Inactivated on 16 June 1952
 Redesignated 307th Air Refueling Group on 14 June 1977
 Activated on 1 July 1977
 Inactivated on 1 October 1983
 Redesignated 307th Operations Group on 8 December 2010
 Activated on 1 January 2011

Assignments
 Second Air Force, 15 April 1942
 VII Bomber Command, 1 November 1942
 XIII Bomber Command, 9 February 1943 – 15 December 1945
 Army Service Forces, San Francisco Port of Embarkation, 16–18 January 1946
 Fifteenth Air Force, 4 August 1946
 Strategic Air Command, 1 April 1947
 307th Bombardment Wing, 15 August 1947 – 12 July 1948
 307th Bombardment Wing, 12 July 1948 – 16 June 1952 (attached to 3d Air Division, 16 July – 3 November 1948, Far East Air Forces Bomber Command, Provisional, 8 August 1950 – 9 February 1951, not operational after 10 February 1951)
 14th Air Division, 1 July 1977 – 1 October 1983
 307th Bomb Wing, 1 January 2011 – present

Components
 35th Reconnaissance Squadron (later 424th Bombardment Squadron): 15 April 1942 – December 1945
 93d Bomb Squadron: 1 January 2011 – present
 307th Air Refueling Squadron, 16 June 1950 – 16 June 1952 (attached to 43d Bombardment Group c. 1 Jul 1950, 43d Bombardment Wing, 10 February 1951, 6th Bombardment Wing after August 1951)
 307th Consolidated Aircraft Maintenance Squadron; 1 July 1977 – 31 December 1983
 307th Operations Support Flight (later 307th Operations Support Squadron):  1 January 2011 – present
 343d Bomb Squadron: 1 January 2011 – present
 370th Bombardment Squadron: 15 April 1942 – 8 January 1946; 4 August 1946 – 16 June 1952 (attached to 307th Bombardment Wing after 10 February 1951)
 371st Bombardment Squadron: 15 April 1942 – 8 January 1946; 4 August 1946 – 16 June 1952 (attached to 307th Bombardment Wing after 10 February 1951)
 372d Bombardment Squadron: 15 April 1942 – December 1945; 4 August 1946 – 16 June 1952 (attached to 307th Bombardment Wing after 10 February 1951)
 424th Bombardment Squadron: See 35th Reconnaissance Squadron
 916th Air Refueling Squadron: 1 July 1977 – 31 December 1983

Stations

 Geiger Field, Washington, 15 April 1942
 Ephrata Army Air Base, Washington 28 May 1942
 Sioux City Army Air Base, Iowa, 30 September – 20 October 1942
 Hickam Field, Hawaii, 1 November 1942
 Koli Airfield, Guadalcanal, Solomon Islands, February 1943
 Munda Airfield, New Georgia, Solomon Islands, 28 January 1944
 Momote Airfield, Los Negros, Admiralty Islands, C. 29 April 1944

 Wakde Airfield, Wakde, Netherlands East Indies, 24 August 1944
 Wama Airfield, Morotai, Netherlands East Indies, c. 18 October 1944
 Clark Field, Luzon, Philippines, September–December 1945
 Camp Stoneman, California, 16–18 January 1946
 MacDill Field (Later MacDill Air Force Base), Florida, 4 August 1946 – 16 June 1952 (deployed at RAF Waddington and RAF Marham, England, 18 July – 3 November 1948, elements at RAF Lakenheath and RAF Marham, England, 17 February – 1 May 1949, deployed to Kadena Air Base, Okinawa after 8 August 1950)
 Operated from Kadena Air Base, Okinawa, 8 August 1950 – 9 February 1951
 Travis Air Force Base, California, 1 July 1977 – 31 December 1983
 Barksdale Air Force Base, Louisiana, 8 January 2011 – present

Aircraft

 Boeing B-17 Flying Fortress, 1942
 Consolidated B-24 Liberator, 1942–1946
 Boeing B-29 Superfortress, 1946–1951

 Boeing KC-135 Stratotanker, 1977–1983
 Boeing B-52 Stratofortress, 2011–present

References

Notes
 Explanatory notes

 Citations

Bibliography

External links
 307th Bomb Group Association 

Military units and formations of the United States Air Force Reserves